Mandeva refers to Manadeva I, a king of ancient Nepal from 464–505.

It may also refer to:
 Mandeva IV, another Nepali king named Mandeva who ruled from 875–879